Dean Kevin O'Brien (born 15 May 1990 in Sandton) is a South African tennis player. He played college tennis for the Georgia Tech Yellow Jackets.

O'Brien has a career high ATP singles ranking of 507 achieved on 21 April 2014. He also has a career high ATP doubles ranking of 115 achieved on 23 May 2016. He has won 6 ITF doubles titles.

O'Brien won his first ATP Challenger title at the 2015 Levene Gouldin & Thompson Tennis Challenger in the doubles event partnering Ruan Roelofse.

Overall, O'Brien has reached 26 career doubles finals with a record of 8 wins and 18 losses, among which includes a 1–6 record in ATP Challenger Tour finals.

Playing for the South Africa in Davis Cup, O'Brien has a W/L record of 1–2.

ATP Challenger and ITF Futures finals

Doubles: 26 (8–18)

External links

Official website

South African male tennis players
1990 births
Living people
Tennis players from Johannesburg
Georgia Tech Yellow Jackets men's tennis players
White South African people